The R408 is a Regional Route in South Africa that connects Engcobo with Qora Mouth via Dutywa.

External links
 Routes Travel Info

References

Regional Routes in the Eastern Cape